Dabou Airport  is an airport serving Dabou, Côte d'Ivoire.

See also
Transport in Côte d'Ivoire

References

 OurAirports - Dabou
   Great Circle Mapper - Dabou
 Google Earth

Airports in Ivory Coast
Buildings and structures in Lagunes District
Grands-Ponts